S. Rajasekar (19 August 1957 – 8 September 2019) was an Indian cinematographer, film director, and actor. He was one half of the director duo Robert–Rajasekar.

Career 
Rajasekar's first break happened with Kudisai, followed by Oru Thalai Ragam as he worked as cinematographer along with Robert Ashirwatham. Bharathiraja's Nizhalgal provided him the break as a lead actor. He has co-directed many successful films along with Robert Ashirwatham as a director duo known as Robert–Rajasekar.

Later, he acted in many TV serials, notably Thendral, Saravanan Meenatchi, Valli, and Sathya. His role in Saravanan Meenatchi was liked by many, as he portrayed a comedic, friendly dad with ease. This made him a recognizable face among the new generation audience.

Personal life 
Rajasekar married Tara Begam in 1990. The couple had no children.

Death 
On 8 September 2019, Rajasekar died of an illness while he was getting treated at Ramachandra Hospital in Chennai. He was 62 years old, and a resident of Valasaravakkam, Chennai.

Partial filmography

As director duo 

Films

 Palaivana Solai – (1981)
 Kalyanakkaalam – (1982)
 Dhooram Adhighamillai – (1983)
 Chinna Poove Mella Pesu – (1987)
 Paravaigal Palavitham – (1988)
 Manasukkul Mathappu -(1988)

Television

 Naanal – (2008) (up to 50 Episodes)

As actor 

Films

Nizhalgal (1980)
Poo Manam (1989)
Gnana Paravai (1991)
 Chembaruthi (1992) (Guest Appearance)
Ilaya Raagam (1995)
Vallarasu (2000)
Narasimha (2001)
Poovellam Un Vaasam (2002)
Amudhae (2005)
Don Chera (2006)
 Thira (film) (2013)
 Saravanan Irukka Bayamaen (2017)

Television
 Akshaya – Sun TV (1998–1999)
Pushpanjali – Sun TV (2000–2001)
 My Dear Bootham – Sun TV (2004–2007) Gowtham Gowri's father
 Kasthuri – Sun TV (2007–2010)
  Meera – Vijay TV (2010)
 Vasantham – Sun TV (2010–2011)
 Thendral – Sun TV (2009–2014)
 Saravanan Meenatchi – Vijay TV (2011–2018)
  Valli – Sun TV (2015–2019)
 Mappillai – Vijay TV (2017–2018)
 Sathya – Zee tamil (2019)

References

External links 

1957 births
2019 deaths
20th-century Indian film directors
Film directors from Chennai
Male actors in Tamil cinema
Tamil film directors
Tamil-language film directors